Tessaracoccus is a Gram-positive, non-spore-forming, facultatively anaerobic and non-motile bacterial genus from the family Propionibacteriaceae.

References

Propionibacteriales
Bacteria genera